NetDocuments is a cloud-based document, email, and records management service.

NetDocuments was launched in 1999 to sell enterprise applications under the software as a service (SaaS) business model. Its functionality is accessible through a web browser.

History
Established in 1999, NetDocuments is a web-based document and email management service delivered through SaaS, allowing all service users to always be on the latest and most current version of the software through quarterly releases and upgrades. The founders of NetDocuments include the same team that developed SoftSolutions in the late 1980s before being bought by WordPerfect in 1994. 

The company was founded by brothers Kenneth and Lee Duncan, and Alvin Tedjamulia. Kenneth Duncan served as CEO until 2014. NetDocuments is Ken Duncan's second document management company after having founded SoftSolutions in the late 1980s. SoftSolutions was eventually sold to WordPerfect in 1994. WordPerfect was subsequently sold to Novell which did not continue the SoftSolutions document management system but did, however, use the SoftSolutions technology in its GroupWise offering.

In 2021, the company was chosen by the United States Attorney’s office as their cloud-management platform.

In August 2006, NetDocuments developed an integration with Salesforce.com.

In March 2008, NetDocuments embedded Fast Search and Transfer of Microsoft into its service to expand its search functionality.

In July 2014, Frontier Capital announced a $25 million investment into NetDocuments.

In August 2014, Matt Duncan was appointed CEO, replacing his father, Kenneth Duncan.

In August 2015, NetDocuments announced a new strategic partnership with Microsoft, integrating the two companies’ cloud technologies, including an integration of Microsoft Office 365 online web apps with NetDocuments global cloud storage.

In July 2018, Josh Baxter was appointed as the new CEO, replacing Matt Duncan.

In 2022, the company released PatternBuilder, a “document and workflow automation tool that enables law firms, legal teams, and the public sector to automate their expertise and processes so they can be repeated predictably.”

Partnerships & acquisitions 
In 2006, NetDocuments moved its primary data center to the LexisNexis headquarters and formed a distribution partnership with LexisNexis. NetDocuments ended their LexisNexis distribution partnership in 2009 but continued to use the LexisNexis data center as its primary data center until 2011, when it relocated to Arizona. Its secondary data center resides at Zions Bancorporation.

In January 2015, the company announced its acquisition of Recommind’s Decisiv search and enterprise email management system. The product was renamed to NetDocuments EM.

NetDocuments announced in November 2021 that it acquired Afterpattern, a no-code toolkit for legal professionals which allows them to create and automate their workflow.

In October 2022, the company acquired Worldox, a document management solutions company.

References

Software companies of the United States
Companies based in Utah County, Utah
Software companies based in Utah
1999 establishments in Utah